Ponneri division is a revenue division in the Tiruvallur district of Tamil Nadu, India. It comprises the taluks of Gummidipoondi and Ponneri.

References 
 

Revenue blocks in Tiruvallur district